Events from the year 1870 in China.

Incumbents
 Tongzhi Emperor (10th year)
 Regent: Empress Dowager Cixi

Events 
 Miao Rebellion (1854–73)
 Dungan Revolt (1862–77)
 Battle of Ürümqi (1870)
 June — Tianjin Massacre
 Panthay Rebellion
 Tongzhi Restoration

Births 
 Lim Lean Teng (林連登), Malaysian businessman

References